According to Herodotus, Labda was a daughter of the Bacchiad Amphion, and mother of Cypselus, by Eetion. Her name was derived from the fact of her feet being turned outward, and thus resembling the letter lambda, which, by the accounts of the most ancient Greek grammarians, was originally pronounced labda .

Notes

References 

 "Labda." Leonhard Schmitz. Dictionary of Greek and Roman Biography and Mythology. William Smith, editor (1870).

Ancient Greek women

Characters in Greek mythology